Borland C may refer to:
 Borland C++, a C++ compiler which followed and replaced Borland C
 Borland C, a 1990s C computer programming language compiler from Borland

See also
 Turbo C, the predecessor of Borland C proper